The 2000 Franklin Templeton Tennis Classic was a men's Association of Tennis Professionals tennis tournament played on outdoor hard courts in Scottsdale, Arizona in the United States that was part of the International Series of the 2000 ATP Tour. It was the 13th edition of the tournament and was held from March 6 to March 13. Sixth-seeded Lleyton Hewitt won the singles title.

Finals

Singles

 Lleyton Hewitt defeated  Tim Henman 6–4, 7–6(7–2)
 It was Hewitt's 3rd title of the year and the 5th of his career.

Doubles

 Jared Palmer /  Richey Reneberg defeated  Patrick Galbraith /  David Macpherson 6–3, 7–5
 It was Palmer's 1st title of the year and the 15th of his career. It was Reneberg's only title of the year and the 22nd of his career.

References

External links
 ITF tournament edition details

Franklin Templeton Classic
 Franklin Templeton Tennis Classic, 2000
Tennis Channel Open
Franklin Templeton Classic
Franklin Templeton Classic
Franklin Templeton Classic